Broxburn United Football Club was a football club based at Sports Park in Broxburn, West Lothian in Scotland. The club was formed by the amalgamation of the town's two senior clubs Broxburn and Broxburn Athletic in 1912, and was a member of the Scottish Football League from 1921 until 1926.

History
The first Broxburn Football Club was founded in 1883 as Broxburn Thistle, adopting their regular name in 1889. The club was the more senior of the town's two teams and first came to attention as members of the Eastern League in 1891–92.  The club went into abeyance in the 1890s and was revived in 1902.  The club went on to appear in many of the top competitions below the Scottish Football League in subsequent seasons, appearing in the Central Football Combination, the Scottish Football Alliance, the Scottish Football Union and the Central Football League.

Another club, Broxburn Athletic, joined the Eastern Football League in 1905–06 and the Central Football League 1909–10.

Broxburn United was formed in April 1912 when it became clear that a small town like Broxburn could not support two senior sides. United became members of the Central Football League (apart from a spell in the Eastern Football League from 1915 to 1917) and along with much of the membership of this group they were admitted to the newly expanded Scottish Football League Second Division in 1921. 

It appeared to be unrealistic for a town of just 3,000 people to sustain a league club, and although the club's first match in the SFL attracted a crowd of 3,500, an economic downturn meant that too many clubs were trying to attract too few spectators. Broxburn were censured in 1922 for fielding only two first team players in a league match against St Bernard's.

Stenhousemuir player Joe Shortt reported to the League that he had been offered £50 by the representatives of a bookmaker from Glasgow to play poorly in a match against Broxburn United.

The club struggled in the League and finished bottom in the 1925–26 season. Facing re-election, they were rejected in favour of Forfar Athletic and dropped out of the League. Broxburn United joined the Scottish Football Alliance for the 1926–27 season, but found this level to be too financially taxing and soon joined the ranks of Scottish junior football by joining the Midlothian Junior League. The club continued until 1932 when financial troubles finally claimed them.

Colours
1912–1920: Black & white striped shirts, white shorts.
1920–1932: Maroon shirts, white shorts.

Honours
Leith Burgh Cup: 1919-1920
Linlithgowshire Junior Cup: 1900-01, 1901–02, 1919–20, 1920-21
East of Scotland Consolation Cup: 1906-07
Lumley Cup: 1918-19, 1919–20
Dow Cup: 1919-20
Broxburn Charity Cup: 1900-01
Dalmeny Cup: 1920-21
Moffat Cup: 1895-96, 1896–97, 1897–98, 1898–99, 1899-1900
East of Scotland Cup: 1896-97, 1903–04

References

External links
Broxburn United Historical Kits

 
Defunct football clubs in Scotland
Association football clubs established in 1912
Association football clubs disestablished in 1932
Football in West Lothian
Scottish Football League teams
1912 establishments in Scotland
1932 disestablishments in Scotland
Broxburn, West Lothian